Max Zaritsky (1885–1959) was an American union leader of the United Hatters, Cap and Millinery Workers International Union (UHCMW) as well as co-founder of both the American Labor Party and Liberal Party of New York State.

Background

Max Zaritsky was born on April 15, 1885, in Petrikov, Russian Empire.  His father was a rabbi.  In 1906, he immigrated to the US at age 21.

Career

Union leadership

Hatters, Cap and Millinery Workers International Union

In 1906, Zaritsky got a job in a hat and cap factory in Boston.  In 1911, he became general secretary of the millinery union.  In 1919, he became president of the Cloth Hat, Cap and Millinery Workers Union.  In 1934, the Cloth Hat, Cap and Millinery Workers Union merged with the United Hatters of North America union to form the United Hatters, Cap and Millinery Workers International Union (UHCMW), headquartered in New York, and in 1936, Zaritsky became its president.

Zaritsky ousted Communist influence from his union.

CIO

In 1935, United Mine Workers president John L. Lewis formed a "more militant" group within the American Federation of Labor (AFL) called the Committee for Industrial Organizations.  He formed it with Zaritsky of UHCMW, Sidney Hillman, head of the Amalgamated Clothing Workers of America; David Dubinsky, President of the ILGWU, Thomas McMahon, head of the United Textile Workers; John Sheridan of the Mine, Mill and Smelter Workers Union; and Harvey Fremming of the Oil Workers Union. They announced the committee's creation on November 9, 1935, and in 1938, after the AFL revoked the charters of these members, they formed the Congress for Industrial Organizations (CIO).

Zaritsky opposed the CIO's break from the AFL and, with David Dubinsky, initiated a "peace move" between the nascent CIO and its AFL parent.

Political leadership

American Labor Party

In 1936, Zaritsky had joined Sidney Hillman and John L. Lewis in forming the Labor Non-Partisan League (LNPL), which formed the basis of the American Labor Party (ALP), making Zaritsky an ALP co-founder.

Liberal Party of New York

In 1944, Zaritsky co-founded the ALP split-off of the Liberal Party of New York.

Later life

In 1950, Zaritsky retired after 39 years as a labor union official, succeeded by Alex Rose, also a co-founder of the ALP and Liberal Party.

Zaritsky also lectured to colleges and schools on labor issues.

Personal life and death

Zaritsky married Sophie Pilavin.

Zaritsky was a Labor Zionist and served as treasurer of the National Labor Committee for Palestine as well as the National Committee for a Leon Blum Colony in Palestine (who patrons included Herbert H. Lehman, Fiorello H. LaGuardia, Abraham Cohan, Albert Einstein, Felix Frankfurter, Israel Goldstein, Julian W. Mack, Edward F. McGrady, and Robert F. Wagner and whose officers included Rose Schneiderman and Lucy Lang).

Max Zaritsky died age 74 on May 10, 1959, in Boston, Massachusetts, after leaving New York City two years earlier.  He is buried in the Mount Carmel Cemetery of Queens, New York.

In 1991, American Heritage magazine carried a reminiscence of Zaritsky (online, lacking author):       For me he was always just Uncle Max, and she, Aunt Sophie. They lived two houses down from me in suburban Long Island. And though I spent many hours of my childhood in his company in the late forties and early fifties, I never knew who he really was.  To a seven-year-old boy, allowed to romp, read, and listen in his uncle's study (he really wasn't my uncle, just a close family friend), the photographs on the wall of him shaking hands with Harry Truman or presenting a hat to a young Nelson Rockefeller and the ornate, framed testimonials from something called unions meant very little. My main concern in life was whether the gods of baseball would ever allow the Brooklyn Dodgers to win the World Series...  As I grew up, I was able to fill in a few of the facts about his life: He had escaped in the midst of a pogrom from czarist Russia, come to Boston, gone to work in a hat factory, courted and won the boss's daughter while helping organize the workers. Later he became the union's president.  I would have gotten no further had I not decided to audit a course on twentieth-century America during my graduate studies in the late sixties. One day, as the lecturer began elaborating on the New Deal and the rise of the CIO, I found myself listening to a recounting of events involving John L. Lewis and his ally Max Zaritsky of the Hatter's Union.  I stiffened in my seat. Who? Max Zaritsky? Uncle Max? My Uncle Max? I couldn't believe it. Despite my love of history, I still had trouble freeing myself from the delusion that history was made only by people in books, not someone you could know in real life, someone who called you boychikel and let you scramble around his house in a vastly outsized fedora.  I went back to my room and consulted Schlesinger, Leuchtenberg, and other historians.  It was all there: Lewis, Sidney Hillman, the unions, Wagner and the National Labor Relations Act, the strikes, the goon terrorism and the killings at Republic Steel, the caution of the A.F. of L. and the birth of a giant. And smack in the middle of it was Uncle Max.  I had lived a good part of my childhood with him and yet had known so little about him. Now, when I wanted to learn more, he was gone, leaving me only some lovely memories and a watch in the top drawer of my dresser with an inscription on the back: "Presented to Zaritsky from New Jersey Workers Loc. 24. 9-14-34." I had brushed up against history repeatedly and never known it.

Legacy

At his death in 1959, The New York Times declared, "Although his union had only 40,000 members, Mr. Zaritsky won a position of major influence in labor's affairs."  His papers are at the Tamiment Library at New York University.

See also
 United Hatters, Cap and Millinery Workers International Union
 United Hatters of North America
 Committee for Industrial Organizations
 American Labor Party 
 Liberal Party of New York
 Alex Rose (labor leader)

References

External sources
 Tamiment Library:  Guide to the Max Zaritsky Papers TAM.006
 Historical Society of Pennsylvania: Max Zaritsky at fifty; the story of an aggressive labor leadership
 
 Images:
 Historic Images:  Max Zaritsky (1936)

1885 births
1959 deaths
Belarusian Jews
Emigrants from the Russian Empire to the United States
American people of Belarusian-Jewish descent
American Labor Party politicians
Liberal Party of New York politicians
American trade union leaders
Jewish American people in New York (state) politics
Trade unionists from New York (state)
Jewish American trade unionists
UNITE HERE
Activists from New York City
American milliners